Brusati may refer to:

 Franco Brusati (1922–1993), Italian regisseur 
 Giancarlo Brusati (1910–2001), Italian fencer